Macarthys Ltd v Smith (1980) Case 129/79 is an EU law, UK constitutional law and UK labour law case, concerning the construction of a sex discrimination statute, and its compatibility with European treaties, now in the European Union.

Facts
Ms Wendy Smith worked for Macarthys Ltd in their factory. She was paid £50 a week, but a man who had previously worked in the same job for the company had been paid £60 a week. Ms Smith claimed this was unlawful according either to the Equal Pay Act 1970, or the Treaty of the European Community article 119. The company argued she had no claim because the UK's Equal Pay Act 1970 did not allow comparisons with former colleagues. Ms Smith argued that, if this was true under UK law, then European Community law did allow such a comparison, and it would override the UK statute.

Judgment

Court of Appeal
A majority held that Ms Smith had no claim because the EC treaties could not be used as an aid to interpreting UK law. Lord Denning MR dissented, and said that it could. He went on as follows.

A reference for a preliminary ruling was then made to the ECJ.

European Court of Justice
The ECJ held that Ms Smith had a claim because she could compare her pay with a former colleague, thus approving Lord Denning MR's dissent on the interpretation of the UK Act. The ECJ explained the equal work

Court of Appeal
Lord Denning MR, Lawton LJ and Cumming-Bruce LJ ordered Macarthys to pay costs to fulfil the order of the ECJ.

See also
UK labour law
EU law

Notes

References

United Kingdom labour case law
Court of Justice of the European Union case law
1980 in case law
1980 in British law
Lord Denning cases
Court of Appeal (England and Wales) cases
European Union labour case law